Fanetizole shows immunoregulating activity.

Synthesis
Thioureas serve as a convenient starting material for 2-aminothiazoles. 

Reaction of β-phenethylamine with ammonium isothiocyanate gives the thiourea (2) Treatment of that product with phenacyl bromide thus affords the thiazole product.

References

H2 receptor antagonists
Thiazoles